Tiranan Khajornklinmala née Jinda (born 30 July 1957) is a Thai sport shooter and military officer. She competed in rifle shooting events at the 1984 Summer Olympics and the 1988 Summer Olympics, and won a bronze medal in the 50-m rifle prone team event at the 1998 Asian Games. As of 2009, she is a lieutenant colonel in the Royal Thai Army.

Olympic results

References

Tiranan Khajornklinmala
Tiranan Khajornklinmala
ISSF rifle shooters
Tiranan Khajornklinmala
Shooters at the 1984 Summer Olympics
Shooters at the 1988 Summer Olympics
Shooters at the 1998 Asian Games
Asian Games medalists in shooting
Tiranan Khajornklinmala
Medalists at the 1998 Asian Games
1957 births
Living people
Tiranan Khajornklinmala